Riblak-e Olya (also Romanized as Rīblak-e ‘Olyā; also known as Rāh Balag-e‘Olyā, Rāhbalak-e Bālā, and Rībalag-e ‘Olyā) is a village in Harasam Rural District, Homeyl District, Eslamabad-e Gharb County, Kermanshah Province, Iran. At the 2006 census, its population was 174, in 41 families.

References 

Populated places in Eslamabad-e Gharb County